Alone at Montreux is a live solo album by American jazz pianist Ray Bryant recorded at the Montreux Jazz Festival in 1972 and released on the Atlantic label. In a 2016 interview with music journalist Bill King, Bryant stated "I do a lot of solo piano now. I really got into it in 1972 when I was called to play at Montreux Jazz Festival. It was my first time doing a live solo concert and it came off great.".

Reception

AllMusic awarded the album 4 stars with its review by Scott Yanow stating "This solo outing finds Bryant playing swing standards, blues, soulful versions of a couple of current pop tunes and even a bit of boogie".

Track listing
All compositions by Ray Bryant except as indicated
 "Gotta Travel On" (Paul Clayton, Larry Ehrlich, David Lazar, Tom Six) - 4:45
 "Blues #3/Willow Weep for Me" (Ray Bryant/Ann Ronell) - 6:40
 "Cubano Chant" - 4:35
 "Rockin' Chair" (Hoagy Carmichael) - 4:32
 "After Hours" (Avery Parrish) - 3:28
 "Slow Freight" - 5:08
 "Greensleeves" (Traditional) - 2:00
 "Little Suzie" - 2:30
 "Until It's Time for You to Go" (Buffy Sainte-Marie) - 3:23
 "Blues #2" - 3:30
 "Liebestraum Boogie" (Traditional) - 3:30

Personnel 
Ray Bryant - piano

References 

1972 live albums
Ray Bryant live albums
Atlantic Records live albums
Albums produced by Joel Dorn
Albums recorded at the Montreux Jazz Festival
Solo piano jazz albums